Kevin Moran may refer to:
Kevin Moran (footballer) (born 1956), Irish association football and Gaelic football player
Kevin Moran (hurler) (born 1987), Irish hurler presently playing with Waterford GAA
Kevin Moran (politician) (born 1968), Irish politician
Kevin Moran (squash player) (born 1990), Scottish squash player.
Kevin Moran, former bassist for ZAO